Blow the House Down is an album by the American saxophonist Junior Walker, released in 1983. It marked the third time that Walker had signed with Motown Records.

The album peaked at No. 210 on the Billboard 200.

Production
Billed without his All Stars, the album included Walker's son, Autry DeWalt III, on drums. It contains Walker's take on "Urgent", the 1981 Foreigner hit on which he had played a wide-praised sax solo.

Critical reception

Robert Christgau thought that "Walker was always funky in the generic sense, but on this welcome return to his home label eight different producers help him get all fashionably funky as well—without any sense of strain." The Globe and Mail wrote that "the Walker sound is padded and filled with synthesizers, back-up singers and a couple of dozen studio musicians, but the music is never choked in the modern studio mix the way so many Motown albums are these days." The Philadelphia Inquirer praised "Sex Pot", writing that it "has all the bite and wit of Walker at his best ... In the '60s, this song might have put him in the Top 10 again; these days, however, a big, lewd piece of music like this scares off rock radio programmers."

AllMusic noted the album's themes of "sex and lust," writing that "Walker's signifying sax cries are showcased on eight explosive tracks."

Track listing

References

Junior Walker albums
1983 albums
Motown albums
Albums produced by Hal Davis
Albums produced by Norman Whitfield